Leandro Machado may refer to:
 Leandro Machado (footballer, born 1976), Brazilian footballer
 Leandro Machado (football manager) (born 1963), Brazilian football manager
 Leandro Ruiz Machado (born 1977), Brazilian water polo player